, known simply as Seven, is a Japanese animation studio that produces anime and hentai.

Establishment
Seven was founded in September 2007 by ex-Wao World producer Taku Horie. After the bankruptcy of Radix Ace Entertainment in 2006, much of the staff wanted to continue pursuing jobs in the anime business, and after the founding of Seven, many of the Radix employees were enrolled into the company. The studio's first major production was an adult hentai OVA in 2011. In the same year, the studio produced its first televised series, a short-length TV adaptation of Morita-san wa Mukuchi. Although Seven animated numerous short television series and hentai series, it did not produce a full-length series until 2017 with the release of King's Game The Animation.

Works
The list below is a list of Seven's works as a lead animation studio.

Hentai

Buta Hime-sama (2011)
Hakoiri Shōjo: Virgin Territory (2011–2012)
Rinkan Club (2011–2014)
Otome dori (2012)
Sei Yariman Gakuen Enkō Nikki The Animation (2013)
Kagachi-sama Onagusame Tatematsurimasu: Netorare Mura Inya Hanashi (2013)
Koikishi Purely☆Kiss The Animation (2013–2014)
Shin Sei Yariman Gakuen Enkō Nikki The Animation (2014)
Baku Ane: Otōto Shibocchau zo! The Animation (2014)
Rance 01: Hikari wo Motomete The Animation (2014–2016)
Buta no Gotoki Sanzoku ni Torawarete Shōjo o Ubawareru Kyonyū Himekishi & Onna Senshi: Zettai Chinpo Nanka ni Maketari Shinai!! The Animation (2015)
Gyakuten Majo Saiban: Chijo na Majo ni Sabakarechau The Animation (2015)
Nudist Beach ni Shūgakuryokō de!! The Animation (2016)
Hachishaku Hachiwa Keraku Meguri: Igyō Kaikitan The Animation (2016–2017)
Ero Zemi: Ecchi ni Yaru-ki ni ABC - The Animation (2017)
Sōryo to Majiwaru Shikiyoku no Yoru ni... (2017)
Yarimoku Beach ni Shūgakuryokō de!! The Animation (2017)
Baku Ane 2: Otōto Ippai Shibocchau zo! The Animation (2017)
Shikkoku no Shaga The Animation (2017–2019)
Honoo no Haramase Oppai: Ero Appli Gakuen The Animation (2017–2018)
Real Eroge Situation! The Animation (2018)
Soikano: Gyutto Dakishimete The Animation (2018)
Hatsujou Switch Otosareta Shoujo-tachi The Animation (2018)
Wagaya no Liliana-san The Animation (2019)
Seikatsu Shūkan The Animation (2019)
Aikagi The Animation (2019)
Aibeya The Animation (2019)
Love x Holic: Miwaku no Otome to Hakudaku Kankei The Animation (2019)
Tonari no Ie no Anette-san The Animation (2020)
Suketto Sanjou!! The Animation (2020)
Sekufure Osananajimi: Shojo to Doutei wa Hazukashii tte Minna ga Iu kara The Animation (2020)
Inmou (2020–present)
Succubus Stayed Life The Animation (2020–present)

Anime television series

Original video animations

Films

References

External links
Seven Official Website 

 
Japanese animation studios
Japanese companies established in 2007
Animation studios in Tokyo
Mass media companies established in 2007
Hentai companies